The Bering Sea Volcanic Province, also called the Bering Sea Basalt Province, is a group of volcanic fields in western Alaska, United States.

Sites
Imuruk Lake volcanic field
Teller volcanic field
St. George Island
St. Lawrence Island
Nunivak Island
St. Michael volcanic field

References

Volcanoes of Alaska